Orlando Cáceres (born 27 October 1961) is a Puerto Rican wrestler. He competed in the men's freestyle 57 kg at the 1984 Summer Olympics. A year earlier, he placed third at the Pan American Games in 1983. Cáceres was a two time NJ high school state champion for Pemberton in years 1979 and 1980.

References

1961 births
Living people
Puerto Rican male sport wrestlers
Olympic wrestlers of Puerto Rico
Wrestlers at the 1984 Summer Olympics
Place of birth missing (living people)
Pan American Games medalists in wrestling
Pan American Games bronze medalists for the United States
Wrestlers at the 1983 Pan American Games
Medalists at the 1983 Pan American Games